The Bank of Starbuck, at Main and McNeil Sts. in Starbuck, Washington, is a historic building built in 1904.  It was listed on the National Register of Historic Places in 1978.

It was deemed significant as one of few surviving commercial buildings from the town of Starbuck's heyday, after the Oregon Railroad and Navigation Company's main railway line came through in 1882.  Its NRHP nomination also asserts it is a "fine example" of a small town bank in the U.S. west.

References 

Bank buildings on the National Register of Historic Places in Washington (state)
Commercial buildings completed in 1904
Columbia County, Washington
Banks based in Washington (state)
National Register of Historic Places in Columbia County, Washington